The Administrative division codes of the People's Republic of China identify the administrative divisions of China at county level and above. They are published by the National Bureau of Statistics of China with the latest version issued on September 30, 2015.

Coding scheme
Reading from left to right, administrative division codes contain the following information:

 The first and second digits identify the highest level administrative division, which may be a province, autonomous region, municipality or Special Administrative Region (SAR).
 Digits three and four show summary data for the associated prefecture-level city, prefecture (地区 dìqū), autonomous prefecture, Mongolian league, municipal city district or county. Codes 01 – 20 and 51 – 70 identify provincial level cities, codes 21 – 50 represent prefectures, autonomous prefectures and Mongolian leagues.
The fifth and sixth digits represent the county-level division – city district, county-level city, county and the banner area of Inner Mongolia. Codes 01 – 18  represent municipal districts or regions (autonomous prefectures and Mongolian leagues) under the jurisdiction of county-level cities. Codes 21 – 80 stand for counties and Mongolian banner areas while codes 81 – 99 represent county level cities directly administered by a province.

Division codes for statistic use
Division codes for statistic use consist of administrative division codes and another 6 digits, identify administrative divisions of China at village level and above.

For example, 110102 007 003, 110102 refers to Xicheng District, Beijing, 007 refers to Yuetan Subdistrict and 003 refers to Yuetan Community.

See also
Administrative divisions of China
ISO 3166-2:CN
OKATO, a somewhat similar numeric code system used in Russia

References
National Standards of the People's Republic of China (Guobiao) GB/T 2260—1999

External links

China geography-related lists
Geocodes